The 52nd Venice Biennale was an international contemporary art exhibition held in 2007. The Venice Biennale takes place biennially in Venice, Italy. Artistic director Robert Storr curated its central exhibition, "Think with the Senses, Feel with the Mind".

Awards 

 Golden Lion for an artist of the international exhibition: León Ferrari
 Golden Lion for a young artist: Emily Jacir
 Golden Lion for a critic or art historian for contributions to contemporary art: Benjamin H.D. Buchloh
 Golden Lion for lifetime achievement: Malick Sidibé
 Golden Lion for best national participation: Hungarian pavilion with Andreas Fogarasi

References

Further reading 

 
 
 
 
 
 
 
 
 
 
 Robert Storr in Conversation with Irving Sandler "Brooklyn Rail" (July - August 2007): https://brooklynrail.org/2007/07/art/storr-interview
 Lévy, B., Bouchard, M. G., Viau, R. & Han, J.-Y. (2007). Biennales. Vie des arts, 51 (209) https://www.erudit.org/en/journals/va/2007-v51-n209-va1094576/52470ac.pdf

2007 in art
2007 in Italy
Venice Biennale exhibitions